Viking 1 was the first of two spacecraft, along with Viking 2, each consisting of an orbiter and a lander, sent to Mars as part of NASA's Viking program. The lander touched down on Mars on July 20, 1976, the first successful Mars lander in history. Viking 1 operated on Mars for  days (over 6 years) or  Martian solar days, the longest Mars surface mission until the record was broken by the Opportunity rover on May 19, 2010.

Mission 
Following launch using a Titan/Centaur launch vehicle on August 20, 1975, and an 11-month cruise to Mars, the orbiter began returning global images of Mars about five days before orbit insertion. The Viking 1 Orbiter was inserted into Mars orbit on June 19, 1976, and trimmed to a 1,513 x 33,000 km, 24.66 h site certification orbit on June 21. Landing on Mars was planned for July 4, 1976, the United States Bicentennial, but imaging of the primary landing site showed it was too rough for a safe landing. The landing was delayed until a safer site was found, and took place instead on July 20, the seventh anniversary of the Apollo 11 Moon landing. The lander separated from the orbiter at 08:51 UTC and landed at Chryse Planitia at 11:53:06 UTC. It was the first attempt by the United States at landing on Mars.

Orbiter 
The instruments of the orbiter consisted of two vidicon cameras for imaging (VIS), an infrared spectrometer for water vapor mapping (MAWD) and infrared radiometers for thermal mapping (IRTM). The orbiter primary mission ended at the beginning of solar conjunction on November 5, 1976. The extended mission commenced on December 14, 1976, after solar conjunction. Operations included close approaches to Phobos in February 1977. The periapsis was reduced to 300 km on March 11, 1977. Minor orbit adjustments were done occasionally over the course of the mission, primarily to change the walk rate — the rate at which the areocentric longitude changed with each orbit, and the periapsis was raised to 357 km on July 20, 1979. On August 7, 1980, Viking 1 Orbiter was running low on attitude control gas and its orbit was raised from 357 × 33,943 km to 320 × 56,000 km to prevent impact with Mars and possible contamination until the year 2019. Operations were terminated on August 17, 1980, after 1,485 orbits. A 2009 analysis concluded that, while the possibility that Viking 1 had impacted Mars could not be ruled out, it was most likely still in orbit. More than 57,000 images were sent back to Earth.

Lander

The lander and its aeroshell separated from the orbiter on July 20 at 08:51 UTC. The aeroshell's retrorockets fired to begin the lander de-orbit maneuver. After a few hours at about  altitude, the lander was reoriented for atmospheric entry. The aeroshell with its ablative heat shield slowed the craft as it plunged through the atmosphere. During this time, entry science experiments were performed by using a retarding potential analyzer, a mass spectrometer, as well as pressure, temperature, and density sensors. Seven seconds later the aeroshell was jettisoned, and 8 seconds after that the three lander legs were extended. The legs had honeycomb aluminum shock absorbers to soften the landing.

The landing rockets used an 18-nozzle design to spread the hydrogen and nitrogen exhaust over a large area. Since most of Viking's experiments focused on the surface material a more straightforward design would not have served.

Approximately  of propellants were left at landing.

Transmission of the first surface image began 25 seconds after landing and took about four minutes (see below). During these minutes the lander activated itself. It erected a high-gain antenna pointed toward Earth for direct communication and deployed a meteorology boom mounted with sensors. In the next seven minutes the second picture of the 300° panoramic scene (displayed below) was taken. On the day after the landing the first colour picture of the surface of Mars (displayed below) was taken. The seismometer failed to uncage, and a sampler arm locking pin was stuck and took five days to shake out. Otherwise, all experiments functioned normally.

The lander had two means of returning data to Earth: a relay link up to the orbiter and back, and by using a direct link to Earth. The orbiter could transmit to Earth (S-band) at 2,000 to 16,000 bit/s (depending on distance between Mars and Earth), and the lander could transmit to the orbiter at 16,000 bit/s. The data capacity of the relay link was about 10 times higher than the direct link.

The lander had two facsimile cameras; three analyses for metabolism, growth or photosynthesis; a gas chromatograph-mass spectrometer (GCMS); an x-ray fluorescence spectrometer; pressure, temperature and wind velocity sensors; a three-axis seismometer; a magnet on a sampler observed by the cameras; and various engineering sensors.

The Viking 1 lander was named the Thomas Mutch Memorial Station in January 1981 in honour of Thomas A. Mutch, the leader of the Viking imaging team. The lander operated for 2,245 sols (about 2,306 Earth days or 6 years) until November 11, 1982, (sol  ), when a faulty command sent by ground control resulted in loss of contact. The command was intended to uplink new battery charging software to improve the lander's deteriorating battery capacity, but it inadvertently overwrote data used by the antenna pointing software. Attempts to contact the lander during the next four months, based on the presumed antenna position, were unsuccessful. In 2006, the Viking 1 lander was imaged on the Martian surface by the Mars Reconnaissance Orbiter.

Mission results

Search for life 
Viking 1 carried a biology experiment whose purpose was to look for evidence of life.  The Viking lander biological experiments weighed 15.5 kg (34 lbs) and consisted of three subsystems: the pyrolytic release experiment (PR), the labeled release experiment (LR), and the gas exchange experiment (GEX). In addition, independent of the biology experiments, Viking carried a gas chromatograph-mass spectrometer (GCMS) that could measure the composition and abundance of organic compounds in the Martian soil.  The results were surprising and interesting: the GCMS gave a negative result; the PR gave a negative result, the GEX gave a negative result, and the LR gave a positive result.  Viking scientist Patricia Straat stated in 2009, "Our (LR) experiment was a definite positive response for life, but a lot of people have claimed that it was a false positive for a variety of reasons."  Most scientists now believe that the data were due to inorganic chemical reactions of the soil; however, this view may be changing after the recent discovery of near-surface ice near the Viking landing zone.  Some scientists still believe the results were due to living reactions.  No organic chemicals were found in the soil.  However, dry areas of Antarctica do not have detectable organic compounds either, but they have organisms living in the rocks.  Mars has almost no ozone layer, unlike the Earth, so UV light sterilizes the surface and produces highly reactive chemicals such as peroxides that would oxidize any organic chemicals.  The Phoenix Lander discovered the chemical perchlorate in the Martian soil. Perchlorate is a strong oxidant so it may have destroyed any organic matter on the surface. If it is widespread on Mars, carbon-based life would be difficult at the soil surface.

First panorama by Viking 1 lander

Viking 1 image gallery

Test of general relativity 

Gravitational time dilation is a phenomenon predicted by the theory of general relativity whereby time passes more slowly in regions of lower gravitational potential. Scientists used the lander to test this hypothesis, by sending radio signals to the lander on Mars, and instructing the lander to send back signals, in cases which sometimes included the signal passing close to the Sun. Scientists found that the observed Shapiro delays of the signals matched the predictions of general relativity.

Orbiter shots

Lander location

See also 
 Exploration of Mars
 List of missions to Mars
 List of Mars orbiters
 Timeline of artificial satellites and space probes

Notes

References

External links 

 Viking 1 Mission Profile by NASA's Solar System Exploration
 Image – Viking 1 Approaches Mars
 45 years ago: Viking 1 Touches Down on Mars

Missions to Mars
Viking program
1975 in spaceflight
August 1975 events in the United States
Derelict landers (spacecraft)
Lunae Palus quadrangle
Nuclear-powered robots
Spacecraft launched by Titan rockets
Soft landings on Mars
Spacecraft launched in 1975
1975 in Florida
1976 on Mars